In mathematics, a Rajchman measure, studied by ,  is a regular Borel measure on a locally compact group such as the circle, whose Fourier transform vanishes at infinity.

References

Measures (measure theory)